Baxter is the name of several communities in the U.S. state of West Virginia.

Baxter, Berkeley County, West Virginia
Baxter, Marion County, West Virginia